Road Trip is a 2011 album from American guitarist Duane Eddy.  Mojo placed the album at number 37 on its list of "Top 50 albums of 2011."

Track listing
 "The Attack of the Duck Billed Platypus" (John Trier) – 4:07
 "Twango" (Duane Eddy) – 2:51
"Curveball" (Eddy) – 3:33
"Road Trip" (Eddy) – 2:52
"Bleaklow Air" (John Trier) – 4:14
"Kindness Ain't Made of Sand" 	(Eddy, Richard Hawley) – 3:50
"Mexborough Ferry Boat Halt" (Eddy, Shez Sheridian) – 3:44
 "Desert Song" (Eddy, Hawley) – 5:49
"Primeval" (Eddy, Hawley) – 2:33
"Rose of the Valley" (Eddy, Hawley) – 3:49
"Franklin Town" (Eddy, Sheridian) – 2:37

References

2011 albums
Duane Eddy albums